Madison Square Garden Entertainment Corp. (also known as MSG Entertainment) is an American entertainment holding company based in New York City. The company was established in 2020 when The Madison Square Garden Company (now MSG Sports) spun off its non-sports assets as an independent, publicly-traded company.

MSG Entertainment controls live events at Madison Square Garden, both in the arena and in The Theater at Madison Square Garden. In addition to the Garden itself, MSG Entertainment operates two other theaters in Manhattan: Radio City Music Hall and the Beacon Theatre. Outside New York City, MSG Entertainment controls the operations of the Chicago Theatre (acquired in 2008), co-booking at the Wang Theatre in Boston (since 2008), and is constructing an entertainment venue in Las Vegas known as MSG Sphere at The Venetian. MSG Entertainment also produces the Radio City Christmas Spectacular (starring the Rockettes), both at Radio City Music Hall and in venues around the United States.

On March 26, 2021, MSG Entertainment announced that it would acquire the regional sports network group MSG Networks in an all-stock deal, reuniting it with its namesake venue; MSG Networks had originally been spun out from The Madison Square Garden Company in 2015. The acquisition was completed in July 2021.

Its origins can trace back to 2010 when Cablevision Systems Corporation spun off the Madison Square Garden properties into a new company called The Madison Square Garden Company.

MSG has used facial recognition systems at its venues since 2018. In July 2022, MSG Entertainment instituted a policy that blacklists representatives of law firms that have been engaged in litigation with MSG or its subsidiaries from attending its venues in New York City. The company stated that this is for professional conduct reasons. MSG Entertainment has faced criticism for using facial recognition to enforce this policy, which is being probed by the Attorney General of New York.

Executive management

 James L. Dolan – Executive Chairman and CEO
 Andrew Lustgarten - President
 Mark FitzPatrick – Executive Vice President and Chief Financial Officer
 Scott Packman – Executive Vice President and General Counsel

References 

Holding companies based in New York City
Holding companies established in 2020
Entertainment companies established in 2020
American companies established in 2020
Mass media companies based in New York City
Madison Square Garden Sports
2020 establishments in New York City
Corporate spin-offs